Scartazzini is a surname. Notable people with the surname include:

 Andrea Lorenzo Scartazzini (born 1971), Swiss composer
 Giovanni Andrea Scartazzini (1837–1901), Protestant pastor and Italian-Swiss literary critic

See also
 Scartezzini